Judah Bezalel ben Ze'ev Wolf Eliasberg (1800, Ivenitz, Russia – 1847, Minsk, Russia) was a Hebrew writer and translator. He translated from Polish to Hebrew the medical work of Friedrich Felix Pauliczki, published in 1834 under the title Marpe le-Am ('Healing for the Populace').

References

External links
 Sefer marpe la-ʻam: kolel etsot tovot le-khalkel ha-beri'ut at the YIVO Institute for Jewish Research

1800 births
1847 deaths
Belarusian Jews
Jews from the Russian Empire
Translators to Hebrew
19th-century translators